The Girl with the Louding Voice is a 2020 coming of age novel and the debut novel of Nigerian writer Abi Daré. It tells the story about a teenage Nigerian girl called Adunni who becomes a maid and struggles with many things growing up, including her limited education, poverty and her ability to speak up for herself.

Writing process
Abi Dare stated that she first had the idea for the novel when she read a news article about a 13 year house help who was poured hot water by her Madam. Daré also stated that the book was partly inspired by her daughters and her years living in rural Nigeria.
It was written within a period of 3 years with her forming some of the non standard English with some borrowed words from Pidgin English which she eventually used in writing the novel. Dare's reason for using non-standard English was that she believes that standard English is not a measure of intelligence.

Plot 
Adunni is a 14-year-old girl from a poor home who lives in a small town near the city of Lagos. She wishes to get educated but she cannot due to lack of funds. When things start getting sour, her father Papa marries her off to Morufu as his third wife in order to use her bride price for the family upkeep against her wish.
After a rape experience, she runs to Lagos where she is employed by Big Madam who abuses her several times and turned into a slave but Adunni is determined to face all this things when she makes up her mind that education is the only way to be free from her oppressions.

Themes
The Girl with the Louding Voice deals with women's voice, the ability to speak up and the drive toward pushing to get to one's dream as showcased by the main character Adunni. It has also been noted for its realistic depiction of poverty in Nigeria and Child marriage which the main character battles with in order to get education.

Reception 
The book received several positive reviews and became a New York Times Bestseller and is a Read with Jenna choice and a BBC Radio 4 Book at Bedtime pick. Published by Sceptre, an imprint of Hodder, it was shortlisted for the Desmond Elliott Prize for first time novelists. It was recommended by several Media outlet including The New York Times, Vogue and Essence. A starred review by Kirkus Reviews called it "Heartbreaking and inspiring."

References

2020 Nigerian novels
2020 debut novels
Novels set in Nigeria
Novels set in Lagos
Feminist books
Sceptre (imprint) books
E. P. Dutton books